Hubert Mathis (12 March 1950) was a French professional road bicycle racer.

Major results

1976
Tour de France:
Winner stage 19
1978
GP de Soissons

External links 

Official Tour de France results for Hubert Mathis

French male cyclists
1950 births
Living people
French Tour de France stage winners
Place of birth missing (living people)